A-Teen is a South Korean streaming television series. A production of Naver subsidiary PlayList Global, the first season aired on Naver TV Cast from July 1 to September 16, 2018, on Wednesdays and Sundays at 19:00 (KST). This is the sequel to the web drama Seventeen. This time, unlike the previous work, it deals with the stories of high school students turning 18. Venue sponsorship is the same as Seventeen.

The second season premiered on April 25, 2019.

Synopsis
The story of six students and how they deal with their teenage years.

Introduction 
It's easy to talk about past teens, but we're having teens for the first time right now. Because every moment was so sincere to say that I will not worry. Teenage sympathetic romance web drama.

Cast

Main
 Shin Ye-eun as Do Ha-na
 Lee Na-eun as Kim Ha-na
 Shin Seung-ho as Nam Shi-woo
 Kim Dong-hee as Ha Min
 Kim Su-hyeon as Yeo Bo-ram
 Ryu Ui-hyun as Cha Gi-hyun

Supporting
 Choi Won-myeong as Choi Won-myung
 Jo So-bin as Kim Na-hee
 Kim Si-eun as Park Ye-ji	
 Baek Soo-hee as Lee Jeong-min
 Ahn Jung-hoon as Nam Ji-woo

Cameo appearances
 Na Jae-min as a student (Ep. 20)
 Lee Je-no as a student (Ep. 20) 
 Ddotty as a video game commentator
 Jung Gun-joo as a Physical education student teacher

Original soundtrack

Part 1

Part 2

Part 3

Part 4

List of episodes

Reception

Viewership
The web series accumulated six million views in one month and a half.

Awards and nominations

Global V LIVE Awards

References

External links
 
 

South Korean drama web series
2018 web series debuts
2018 web series endings
Naver TV original programming
Playlist Studio original programming
Television series about teenagers